This list of Brazilian mathematicians includes the famous mathematicians from Brazil and also those who were born in other countries but later became Brazilians.

See also
 List of mathematicians
 Science and technology in Brazil

Brazilian
 
Mathematicians